The name, Ferrari 208, refers to a 2-liter 8-cylinder Ferrari sports car.  There were two different 208s:
 Ferrari 208 GT4, a Bertone-styled 2+2 with a 1990 cc engine
 Ferrari 208 GTB/GTS, a Pininfarina-styled 2-seat with a 1991 cc engine, later available with a turbocharged engine